Anolis zapotecorum is a species of anole lizard first found in the Mexican states of Oaxaca, Guerrero, and Puebla. The species has keeled ventral scales.

References

External links
Reptile Database

Z
Lizards of North America
Endemic reptiles of Mexico
Natural history of Oaxaca
Natural history of Guerrero
Natural history of Puebla
Reptiles described in 2014
Taxa named by Gunther Köhler